The Bachillerato Anáhuac Campus Monterrey preparatory school, is a branch of the catholic school program of Universidad Anáhuac.  It is located at Batallón de San Patricio, at San Pedro Garza García N.L., Mexico.

The Bachillerato Anáhuac has nearly 200 students. The school uses a bilingual system (60% English 40% Spanish), and teaches German, French and Chinese as well.

References

University-preparatory schools
Catholic schools in Mexico
Educational institutions established in 1968
Boys' schools in Mexico
1968 establishments in Mexico